This is a list of notable road interchanges in Ghana by region. The Ako Adjei Interchange was the first interchange to be constructed in Ghana. It was completed in 1999 by the Rawlings government. The Pokuase Interchange is the largest in Ghana. Other large interchanges include the Kwame Nkrumah and the Kasoa Interchange.

Ashanti 
Asafo Interchange
Asokwa Interchange 
Sofoline Interchange

Central 
Kasoa Interchange

Greater Accra 
Ako Adjei Interchange
Apenkwa Interchange
Dimples Interchange 
Kwame Nkrumah Interchange
Mallam Interchange
Pokuase Interchange - Upon completion, the Pokuase Interchange was the second four level stack interchange in Africa and the first in West Africa. It connects the Nsawam Road to the  George Walker Bush Highway.
Tema Motorway Interchange
Tetteh Quarshie Interchange - The Tetteh Quarshie Interchange was the second Interchange to be built in Ghana after the Ako Adjei Interchange.

Northern 
Tamale interchange - The Tamale Interchange was the first interchange to be constructed in the Northern Region and in Northern Ghana.

References 

 
Road interchanges